Viktoria Martha Huse (born 24 October 1995) is a German field hockey player for the German national team.

She participated at the 2018 Women's Hockey World Cup.

References

1995 births
Living people
German female field hockey players
Female field hockey midfielders
Field hockey players at the 2020 Summer Olympics
Olympic field hockey players of Germany
21st-century German women

2018 FIH Indoor Hockey World Cup players